eGoli is the alternative, Zulu name for Johannesburg, South Africa.

Egoli may also refer to:

Egoli: City of Gold, play by South African playwright Matsemela Manaka
 Egoli: Place of Gold, long-running South African soap opera 
 Egoli Air, airline based in Johannesburg, South Africa
 Egoli (album), a 2019 album by Africa Express
 Presbytery of Egoli, Johannesburg, South Africa

See also

 
 Goli (disambiguation)